Pearisburg Historic District is a national historic district located at Pearisburg, Giles County, Virginia. It encompasses 18 contributing buildings and 1 contributing site in the town of Pearisburg, county seat of Giles County. The district is centered on the Public Square and includes a mix of commercial, institutional, and governmental buildings. Notable buildings include the First National Bank of Pearisburg (1906), Western Hotel (Thomas Building, c. 1827), Pearis Theater (1940), Giles County Sheriff's Office and Jail (1937–38), St. Elizabeth Hospital Building (1920), Giles County Motor Company Building (1923–1924), and Christ Episcopal Church (1910). The Giles County Courthouse is listed separately.

It was listed on the National Register of Historic Places in 1992.

References

Historic districts on the National Register of Historic Places in Virginia
Buildings and structures in Giles County, Virginia
National Register of Historic Places in Giles County, Virginia